Datana perspicua, the spotted datana, is a species of prominent moth in the family Notodontidae. It was described by Augustus Radcliffe Grote and Coleman Townsend Robinson in 1865 and is found in North America.

The MONA or Hodges number for Datana perspicua is 7908.

Subspecies
 Datana perspicua mesillae Cockerell, 1897
 Datana perspicua opposita Barnes & Benjamin, 1927
 Datana perspicua perspicua Grote & Robinson, 1865

References

 Lafontaine, J. Donald & Schmidt, B. Christian (2010). "Annotated check list of the Noctuoidea (Insecta, Lepidoptera) of North America north of Mexico". ZooKeys, vol. 40, 1-239.

Further reading

 Arnett, Ross H. (2000). American Insects: A Handbook of the Insects of America North of Mexico. CRC Press.

External links

 Butterflies and Moths of North America
 NCBI Taxonomy Browser, Datana perspicua

Notodontidae
Moths described in 1865
Moths of North America
Taxa named by Augustus Radcliffe Grote
Taxa named by Coleman Townsend Robinson